Ponticelli may refer to:
Ponticelli, an eastern suburb of Naples, Italy
Lazare Ponticelli (1897 – 2008), the last surviving official French veteran of the First World War
Ponticelli (Città della Pieve)